Paddy Hirsch is a fiction and non-fiction author, journalist and economic commentator. He is the author of the Justice Flanagan series of historical thrillers, including The Devil's Half Mile and Hudson's Kill, and of Man vs Markets, Economics Explained, Plain and Simple, a lighthearted, illustrated book explaining the workings of the financial markets, published by HarperCollins. Hirsch is the editor of the NPR podcast The Indicator, from Planet Money. Previously he was a Senior Producer at the American Public Media production house Marketplace, where he produced the weekend personal finance program Marketplace Money and produced and hosted the Marketplace Whiteboard, a weekly video explainer covering the financial markets and the economy. Marketplace Whiteboard was a Webby Award Honoree in 2009. Hirsch was editor of the Marketplace New York Bureau throughout the financial crisis of 2008/2009. In 2010 he was awarded a fellowship with the John S. Knight Fellowships for Professional Journalists at Stanford University. He was a Webby Award nominee in 2009 and was a 2014 winner of the Edward R Murrow award for excellence in reporting.

Biography
Hirsch was born in Weymouth, England, and grew up in Northern Ireland and Dublin, Ireland. He joined Marketplace in March 2007. Previously, he worked as a senior editor for Leveraged Commentary & Data, a division of Standard and Poor's, and for Bank Letter, a newsletter in the Euromoney Institutional Investor portfolio. He worked as the editor of the Vietnam Economic Times in 1998, and as a field producer at CNBC Asia in Hong Kong between 1995 and 1997. Before becoming a journalist, he served as an officer in the Royal Marines from 1986 to 1995. He graduated top of his class from the Commando Training Centre Royal Marines, and was awarded the Sword of Honour. Hirsch attended the University of Warwick in the United Kingdom, and Campbell College in Belfast, Northern Ireland.

References

External links
 American Public Media names Paddy Hirsch Senior Producer, Personal Finance, Marketplace
 Marketplace Whiteboard webpage
 Leveraged Commentary & Data
 The Royal Marines

Year of birth missing (living people)
Living people
American Public Media
American public radio personalities
American radio journalists
American reporters and correspondents
Journalists from Northern Ireland
Radio personalities from California
Royal Marines officers
Stanford University Knight Fellows
Male non-fiction writers from Northern Ireland